Luminosa Bogliolo (born 3 July 1995) is an Italian hurdler who won a gold medal at the 2019 Summer Universiade and a silver medal at the 2018 Mediterranean Games.

In 2020 Bogliolo, winning BAUHAUS-galan in Stockholm, became the first Italian female in history to win a stage in the Diamond League. She competed at the 2020 Summer Olympics, in 100 m hurdles.

Biography

Her explosion in 2018
In 2018, establishing her Personal Best on 100 metres hurdles with 12.99, at 23 May 2018 had reached the 13th place in the seasonal European lists, thus obtaining the EAA standard and the selection for the 2018 European Athletics Championships.

In September she won in Pescara her first national championship. She is engaged to the hurdler Lorenzo Perini.

2019: nine times under 12.90 seconds
She has also obtained two other results under 13 seconds, but with a wind higher than the norm of +2.0 mps.

2021 the Olympic year
The outdoor season start on 13 May in Savona, Italy with 12,84 another results under 12.90.

National record
100 metres hurdles: 12.75 -  Tokyo, 1 August 2021

Personal Best
100 metres hurdles: 12.75 -  Tokyo, 1 August 2021
60 metres hurdles: 8.10 -  Ancona, 16 February 2019

Achievements

National titles
Bogliolo won five national championships at individual senior level.

 Italian Athletics Championships
 100 m hurdles: 2018, 2019, 2020, 2021 (4)
 Italian Athletics Indoor Championships
 60 m hurdles: 2019 (1)

See also
 Italian all-time lists - 100 metres hurdles
 Italy at the 2018 Mediterranean Games

Notes

References

External links
 

1995 births
Living people
People from Albenga
Italian female hurdlers
Athletes (track and field) at the 2018 Mediterranean Games
Mediterranean Games silver medalists for Italy
Mediterranean Games medalists in athletics
World Athletics Championships athletes for Italy
Athletics competitors of Fiamme Oro
Italian Athletics Championships winners
Universiade gold medalists in athletics (track and field)
Universiade gold medalists for Italy
Competitors at the 2017 Summer Universiade
Medalists at the 2019 Summer Universiade
Athletes (track and field) at the 2020 Summer Olympics
Olympic athletes of Italy
Sportspeople from the Province of Savona
20th-century Italian women
21st-century Italian women